Robert Timothy Wilkins (January 16, 1896 – May 26, 1987) was an American country blues guitarist and vocalist, of African-American and Cherokee descent. His distinction was his versatility: he could play ragtime, blues, minstrel songs, and gospel music with equal facility.

Career
Wilkins was born in Hernando, Mississippi, 21 miles from Memphis, Tennessee. He performed in Memphis and north Mississippi during the 1920s and early 1930s, the same time as Furry Lewis, Memphis Minnie (whom he claimed to have tutored), and Son House. He also organized a jug band to capitalize on the "jug band craze" then in vogue. Though never attaining success comparable to that of the Memphis Jug Band, Wilkins reinforced his local popularity with a 1927 appearance on a Memphis radio station. From 1928 to 1936 he recorded for Victor and Brunswick Records, alone or with a single accompanist, like Sleepy John Estes, and unlike Gus Cannon of Cannon's Jug Stompers. He sometimes performed as Tom Wilkins or as Tim Oliver (his stepfather's name).

In 1936, at the age of 40, he quit playing the blues and joined the church after witnessing a murder where he performed. In 1950, he was ordained. In 1964 Wilkins was "rediscovered" by blues revival enthusiasts  Dick and Louisa Spottswood, making appearances at folk festivals and recording his gospel blues for a new audience. These include the 1964 Newport Folk Festival; his performance of "Prodigal Son" there was included on the Vanguard Records album Blues at Newport, Volume 2. In 1964 he also recorded his first full album, Rev. Robert Wilkins: Memphis Gospel Singer, for Piedmont Records. Another full session, recorded live at the 1969 Memphis Country Blues Festival, was released in 1993 as "...Remember Me".

Wilkins died on May 26, 1987, in Memphis at the age of 91. His son, Reverend John Wilkins (1943-2020), continued his father's gospel blues legacy.

His best-known songs are "That's No Way to Get Along" and his reworked gospel version, "The Prodigal Son" (which was covered under that title by the Rolling Stones), "Rolling Stone", and "Old Jim Canan's". The Stones were forced to credit "The Prodigal Son" to Wilkins after lawyers approached the band and asked for the credit to be changed. Early pressings of Beggars Banquet credited only Mick Jagger and Keith Richards as composers, not Wilkins. The original Beggars Banquet toilet cover credited Wilkins. When the record company rejected the cover, the revised plain white cover mistakenly credited Jagger-Richards as composer. Recent CD releases use the toilet photo with proper credit.

See also
Memphis blues
Adelphi Records

References

External links
 Illustrated Robert Wilkins discography

1896 births
1987 deaths
People from Hernando, Mississippi
American blues guitarists
American male guitarists
American blues singers
American people of Cherokee descent
Blues musicians from Mississippi
Country blues musicians
Memphis blues musicians
20th-century American singers
20th-century American guitarists
Guitarists from Mississippi
20th-century American male musicians